The Bishop Manor Estate is a historic estate near St. Elmo in rural Mobile County, Alabama, United States.  Contributing to the National Register of Historic Places listing are a main house, a five bay garage, a guest house, two outbuildings, a swimming pool and a pavilion.  Spread over a formally landscaped , the Mediterranean Revival style estate was built in 1925 by Steven Bishop.  It was placed on the National Register of Historic Places on February 14, 1985.

References

Houses on the National Register of Historic Places in Alabama
Houses completed in 1925
National Register of Historic Places in Mobile County, Alabama
Houses in Mobile County, Alabama
Mediterranean Revival architecture in Alabama